Marie-Jeanne L'Héritier de Villandon (12 November 1664 – 24 February 1734) was an aristocratic French writer and salonnière of the late 17th century, and a niece of Charles Perrault.

Biography
She published three fairy tales early in her career. Although she wrote few thereafter, she marked the beginning of the fairy tale vogue among the Précieuses, publishing her first tale a year before her uncle, the famed author of Les Contes de ma Mère l’Oye (Tales of Mother Goose) in 1696. A great friend and protégé of Madeleine de Scudéry, L'Héritier's participation in the fairy tale genre reflected her involvement in the salon scene, as she and so many of her friends and fellow salonnières, such as Madame d'Aulnoy and Henriette-Julie de Murat, were monumental in the inception of the fairy tale genre, along with her esteemed uncle. She inherited Scudéry's salon upon her death in 1701.

Works

Fairy tales
 Marmoisan - a literary tale classified in the Aarne-Thompson-Uther Index as ATU 884A, "The Forsaken Fiancée: Service as Menial".
 Ricdin-Ricdon - a literary predecessor to tale type ATU 500, "The Name of the Helper", akin to Rumplestiltskin

References

External links
Les Caprices du Destin (French)
Oeuvres meslées, contenant L'innocente tromperie, L'avare puni, Les enchantemens de l'éloquence, Les aventures de Finette, nouvelles , et autres ouvrages, en vers et en prose (French)

1664 births
1734 deaths
Collectors of fairy tales
French women writers
French women short story writers
French short story writers
Women science fiction and fantasy writers
Women folklorists